Nandito Ako may refer to:

 Nandito Ako (album), a 1997 album by Thalía
 Nandito Ako (TV series), a television mini-series in the Philippines
 "Nandito Ako" (song), a Filipino song by Ogie Alcasid